The acquisition of 21st Century Fox by The Walt Disney Company was announced on December 14, 2017, and was completed on March 20, 2019. Among other key assets, the acquisition included the 20th Century Fox film and television studios, U.S. cable channels such as FX, Fox Networks Group, a 73% stake in National Geographic Partners, Indian television broadcaster Star India, and a 30% stake in Hulu. Immediately preceding the acquisition, 21st Century Fox spun off the Fox Broadcasting Company, Fox Television Stations, Fox News Channel, Fox Business, Fox Sports 1 and 2, Fox Deportes, and the Big Ten Network into the newly formed Fox Corporation. Other 21st Century Fox assets such as the Fox Sports Networks and Sky were divested and sold off to third parties such as Comcast, Sinclair Broadcast Group and Yankee Global Enterprises.

History

Early developments (November 2017–April 2018)
On November 6, 2017, CNBC reported The Walt Disney Company was negotiating a deal with Rupert Murdoch to acquire 21st Century Fox's filmed entertainment, cable entertainment, and direct broadcast satellite divisions, including 20th Century Fox, FX Networks, and National Geographic Partners. The deal would reportedly exclude the Fox Broadcasting Company, 20th Century Fox's studio lot, Fox Television Stations, Fox News Group, and Fox Sports, which would be spun off into a new independent company run by the Murdoch family. According to Disney's CEO Bob Iger, the idea of purchasing Fox's assets came after Disney acquired majority control of the streaming company BAMTech with anticipation to develop its own streaming service (which would eventually be called Disney+, launched in November 2019). Disney was less interested in Fox's production capacities and more keen to acquire Fox's own film and television libraries to help expand the streaming service's library. For instance, the two had done business before in 2001 when Disney acquired the Fox Family Channel from the original incarnation of News Corporation and promptly rebranded it as ABC Family and eventually Freeform. Additionally, as 20th Century Fox was the last major studio from the studio era to be acquired when Rupert Murdoch took full control in 1985, its film library was largely intact relative to its peers from that era such as Metro-Goldwyn-Mayer.

The deal would also include film rights to certain franchises owned by 20th Century Fox, such as X-Men, Deadpool, and Fantastic Four, the distribution rights to Star Wars: Episode IV – A New Hope (which were not owned by Marvel Studios and Lucasfilm respectively when Disney acquired the two companies), as well as consolidate ownership of other franchises both share such as Home Alone and give Disney access to adult animation with ownership of The Simpsons (which Disney would fully embrace under the Disney moniker) and Family Guy (which in the following years after the acquisition would break the fourth wall by making inside jokes on what they were allowed to do now that they were owned by Disney). Talks had stalled for the day without a deal being finalized, but it was reported on November 10 that the prospected deal had yet to be fully abandoned.

On November 16, it was reported that Comcast (parent company of NBCUniversal, Xfinity, and Comcast Spectacor), Verizon Communications, and Sony (parent company of Sony Pictures, Sony Music, and Sony Interactive Entertainment) had also joined Disney in a bidding war for 21st Century Fox. During a recent shareholders meeting, 21st Century Fox Co-Chairman Lachlan Murdoch said Fox was not in the category of "sub-scale" companies that were "finding it difficult to leverage their positions in new and emerging video platforms", but was instead a company that had "the required scale to continue to both execute on our aggressive growth strategy and deliver significant increased returns to shareholders".

Because Disney owns the American Broadcasting Company (ABC), Comcast owns the National Broadcasting Company (NBC), and 21st Century Fox owned the Fox Broadcasting Company, a full acquisition of Fox by Disney or Comcast would have been illegal under the Federal Communications Commission (FCC)'s rules prohibiting a merger between any of two of the four major broadcast networks.

On November 28, while mentioning a rumor that the rumored negotiations between Disney and Fox were progressing at a rapid pace, Mike Fleming Jr. of Deadline Hollywood commented, "given how Disney made the Marvel and Lucasfilm deals under the cone of silence, if this happens we'll probably only know it when it's announced. It is certainly being talked about today."

Rumors of a nearing deal continued on December 5, with additional reports suggesting the FSN regional sports networks would be included in the sale (assets that would likely be aligned with Disney's ESPN division).

On December 11, Comcast announced it was dropping its bid on the Fox assets. On December 14, Disney and Fox confirmed a $52.4 billion deal to merge the two companies, pending approval from the United States Department of Justice Antitrust Division.

In February, CNBC reported that, despite the Disney–Fox deal, Comcast might take action to outbid Disney's $52.4 billion offer, if the AT&T–Time Warner merger went through. Despite this, Fox President Peter Rice stated he was content with the Disney offer and that the Fox assets were "a great fit for Disney."

Early in March, the non-profit group Protect Democracy Project Inc. filed a lawsuit against the United States Department of Justice (DOJ) on the hopes to seek any records of communications between the two groups over Disney's pending acquisition of Fox. The lawsuit also sought "any related antitrust enforcement efforts by the DOJ, to find out whether the president or his administration is improperly interfering with the independence of the DOJ out of favoritism for a political ally." Donald Trump congratulated Murdoch for the Disney–Fox deal while attacking AT&T's acquisition of Time Warner, particularly over the ownership of CNN, which he frequently criticized due to alleged bias.

On April 12, 2018, Rice revealed the acquisition was expected to close by summer 2019. Beginning in March 2018, a strategic reorganization of the Disney conglomerate saw the creation of two business segments, Disney Parks, Experiences and Products and Walt Disney Direct-to-Consumer & International. Parks & Consumer Products was primarily a merger of Parks & Resorts and Consumer Products & Interactive Media, while Direct-to-Consumer & International took over for Disney International and global sales, distribution, and streaming units from Disney–ABC Television Group, Studio Entertainment, and Disney Digital Network. Given that Iger described it as "strategically positioning our businesses for the future", The New York Times considered the reorganization done in expectation of the 21st Century Fox purchase.

Bidding war between Disney and Comcast (May–July 2018)
On May 7, 2018, it was reported that Comcast spoke to investment banks about topping Disney's offer to acquire Fox. Shortly afterwards, Bob Iger stated he was willing to drop Sky plc from the deal to ensure the Fox acquisition.

Several Fox investors said they would be open to terminate the company's agreement with Disney if Comcast followed through on its plan to launch a rival all-cash bid for $60 billion. Murdoch's family trust controlled 39% of Fox due to shares it held with special voting rights. However, under the company's by-law, those special rights did not apply to a vote on the Disney/Fox deal when the Murdoch trust only controlled 17% of the vote, making it easier for other shareholders to defeat him, which was expected as early as next month. Later that month, it was confirmed that Lachlan Murdoch, rather than James Murdoch, would take charge of the New Fox company.

The following week, Comcast publicly announced it was looking into making an all-cash counter-offer for the Fox assets that Disney proposed to acquire. Shortly after, it was reported that Disney was looking into making its own all-cash counter-offer for Fox assets if Comcast went through with their offer.

The next day, Disney and Fox announced they had set their shareholder vote meetings for July 10, although both said Fox's meeting could be postponed if Comcast came through with their offer.

On June 12, AT&T was given approval by District Judge Richard J. Leon to acquire Time Warner, easing concerns Comcast had regarding whether government regulators would block their bid for Fox. Consequently, the next day, Comcast mounted a bid of $65 billion for the 21st Century Fox assets that were set to be acquired by Disney.

On June 18, it was reported that Disney will add to its already existing $52 billion claim to contest Comcast's proposed counter-offer for the Fox assets.

On June 20, Disney and Fox announced they had amended their previous merger agreement, upping Disney's offer to $71.3 billion (a 10% premium over Comcast's $65 billion offer), while also offering shareholders the option of receiving cash instead of stock. On June 21, Murdoch said in response to Disney's higher offer: "We are extremely proud of the businesses we have built at 21st Century Fox, and firmly believe that this combination with Disney will unlock even more value for shareholders as the new Disney continues to set the pace at a dynamic time for our industry." That still does not prevent other companies from making a bid, as the deal was needed to be voted on by shareholders.

Iger explained the reasoning behind the bid: "Direct-to-consumer distribution has actually become an even more compelling proposition in the six months since we announced the deal. There has just been not only a tremendous amount of development in that space, but clearly the consumer is voting—loudly."

On June 27, the United States Department of Justice gave antitrust approval to Disney under the condition of selling Fox's 22 regional sports channels within 90 days of closing, to which the company has agreed. The next day, Disney and Fox boards scheduled July 27, 2018 as the day shareholders vote on Fox's properties being sold to Disney.

On July 9, a Fox shareholder filed a lawsuit to stop the acquisition from Disney citing the absence of financial projections for Hulu. On the same day, CNBC reported Comcast was looking for companies that could take over Fox's Regional Sports Networks. The shareholder claimed that would've made Comcast's antitrust problems regarding the takeover of Fox assets easier as Comcast was preparing to make a new all cash counter-offer before July 27, 2018.

On July 12, the Department of Justice filed a notice of appeal with the D.C. Circuit to reverse the District Court's approval for AT&T acquisition of Time Warner (later becoming WarnerMedia). Analysts said the chances of the DOJ win are small, but would be the "final nail in the coffin for Comcast's Fox chase. This is a clear gift to Disney." On the next day, CEO of AT&T Randall L. Stephenson gave an interview with CNBC, about Comcast's bid for Fox: "It probably can't help it. You're in a situation where two entities are bidding for an asset, and this kind of action can obviously influence the outcome of those actions."

On July 13, Disney received the support of the Institutional Shareholder Services and Glass Lewis, the two most prominent proxy adviser firms in the world. Fox shareholders were recommended by the advisers as means to provide for Disney's future.

On July 16, CNBC reported Comcast was unlikely to continue its bidding war with Disney to acquire Fox. Instead, Comcast is likely to continue pursuing 61% stake of Sky.

On July 19, Comcast officially announced it was dropping its bid on the Fox assets in order to focus on its bid for Sky. The CEO of Comcast, Brian L. Roberts, said "I'd like to congratulate Bob Iger and the team at Disney and commend the Murdoch family and Fox for creating such a desirable and respected company."

Road to completion (July 2018–March 2019)
On July 25, 2018, TCI Fund Management, the second largest shareholder of 21st Century Fox, indicated it voted to approve the Disney–Fox deal. On July 27, Disney and Fox shareholders approved the merger between the two companies.

There were reports on August 9 that Viacom CEO Bob Bakish wanted to license its television ad targeting tech to the entire industry, starting with Fox. On August 12, the Competition Commission of India approved the Disney–Fox deal.

On September 17, the European Commission scheduled a merger review for October 19, which was later postponed to November 6.

On October 5, Disney announced the commencement of exchange offers and consent solicitations for 21st Century Fox.

On October 10, it was reported that the new, post-merger organizational structure of "New Fox" would be implemented by January 1, 2019, ahead of the closure of the Disney sale (which is still expected to occur during the first half of 2019).

On October 15, Disney offered a list of concessions to the European Commission, which extended the review deadline to November 6. The European Commission on November 6, 2018 cleared the sale, pursuant to the divestment of certain factual television networks in Europe owned by the Disney/Hearst joint venture A&E Networks, including Blaze, Crime & Investigation, History, H2, and Lifetime. Disney will continue to be a 50 percent owner of A&E everywhere outside of the European Economic Area.

On November 19, China's regulators approved the Disney–Fox deal, without any conditions. After obtaining approval from Chinese regulators, Disney said it still needed to obtain regulatory approval from several other regulators, though the approvals from the United States, European Union, and China were considered the most important hurdles to clear.

On December 3, Brazil's Administrative Council for Economic Defense (CADE) said the deal would concentrate the market of cable sports channels. CADE recommended remedial measures.

By December 14, the merger was subjected to regulation in Mexico, where Disney/Fox would account for 27.8% of content distribution across all genres. Disney would own 73% of all sports channels in Mexico. On January 31, Mexico's Federal Commission of Economic Competition (COFECE) approved the Disney–Fox deal after Disney agreed to sell its stake in Walt Disney Studios Sony Pictures Releasing de México, a Mexican film distributor, to Sony Pictures Entertainment Motion Picture Group.

On January 7, 2019, the registration statement for "New Fox", under the name Fox Corporation, was filed with the U.S. Securities and Exchange Commission.

On January 11, it was reported that the deal is expected to close by either February or March 2019. However, on January 30, in a SEC filing by Disney, it was reported that the deal is expected to close by June 2019.

Bob Iger met with Brazil's antitrust regulator CADE on February 12, 2019 to discuss the Disney–Fox deal. However, a decision on the deal still could not be reached. However, on February 20, Bloomberg said CADE will make its ruling on the Disney–Fox deal on February 27, 2019. On February 21, Bloomberg reported Disney will divest Fox Sports in Brazil and Mexico to get approval in these countries. The two countries are among the last major hurdles for the Disney–Fox deal. On February 27, Brazil's antitrust agency CADE approved the merger with conditions requiring Disney to divest Fox Sports Brazil among other measures. The regulator said it coordinated with regulators in Mexico and Chile in evaluating the transaction. Brazil's approval clears one of the final hurdles, allowing the deal to be completed in March.

On March 4, The Walt Disney Company tweaked Robert Iger's compensation package he would receive upon closing the Disney–Fox deal, removing $13.5 million in potential salary and incentive awards available for the chief executive after the company closes its acquisition of 21st Century Fox Inc. assets.

Mexico's telecom regulator, Federal Telecommunications Institute (IFT), approved the deal on March 11, 2019 under the condition that Disney and Fox agree to sell Fox Sports in the country within six months. They also had to keep the National Geographic brand separate from its A&E channels. This cleared the last major holdout on the deal. On March 12, 2019, Disney announced it was set to close the Fox deal on March 19 of the same year.

Fox Corporation officially became a standalone, publicly traded company, separate from 21st Century Fox, on March 19, 2019 making Fox Corporation the owner of the assets that were not acquired by Disney. The announcement also included appointment of the board of directors. Also on March 19, 21st Century Fox officially completed distribution of new Fox shares ahead of the completion of the Disney deal. The deal was officially completed on the night of March 19, 2019. Under the terms of the acquisition, Disney will phase out Fox brand usage by 2024.

At acquisition (October 2018–March 2019)
Disney announced on October 8, 2018, 21st Century Fox's top television executives would join the company, including Peter Rice, Gary Knell, John Landgraf, and Dana Walden. Rice will serve as Chairman of Walt Disney Television and Co-Chair of Disney Media Networks, succeeding Ben Sherwood while Walden is to be named Chairman of Disney Television Studios and ABC Entertainment. Disney announced on March 5, 2019, Craig Hunegs would lead the combined television operations at Disney Television Studios once the Disney–Fox deal closed. Hunegs would be president of the subsidiary, with oversight of all operations, including ABC Studios, ABC Signature, 20th Century Fox Television and Fox 21 Television Studios. He would report to Dana Walden, chairman of Fox Television Group who would be chairman of Disney Television Studios and ABC Entertainment.

On October 18, 2018, Disney announced a new organizational structure for the Walt Disney Studios and the individual unit heads who would join the company except for Fox's filmed entertainment CEO Stacey Snider, including Emma Watts, Fox 2000 President of Production Elizabeth Gabler, Fox Searchlight Pictures Chairmen Nancy Utley and Stephen Gilula. Watts who currently serves as Vice Chairman and President of production at 20th Century Fox will continue in that post. All Fox film production units would report to Walt Disney Studios Chairman Alan Horn except for Fox Family and 20th Century Fox Animation reporting to Watts and Horn. By March 22, 2019, Fox Family only reports to Watts while Fox Animation reporting only to Horn.

On December 13, 2018, Disney announced a new organizational structure for its international operations and the individuals who would join the company, including Jan Koeoppen and Uday Shankar. Shankar who currently serves as Chairman and President Fox Networks Group Asia and Star India will lead Disney's Asian operations and will become the new Chairman of Disney India.

Aftermath (March 2019–present)
It was reported on March 21, 2019 that Disney would shut down the Fox 2000 Pictures studio in 2020, following the release of The Woman in the Window. On the same day, it was reported that up to 4,000 people would lose their jobs as Disney commenced layoffs following the merger. The top executives given two to six months notice of being laid off include 20th Century Fox film president of domestic distribution Chris Aronson, president of worldwide marketing Pamela Levine, co-president of marketing Kevin Campbell, chief content officer Tony Sella, international distribution president Andrew Cripps, executive vice president of corporate communications Dan Berger, executive vice president of legal affairs and executive vice president of Fox Stage productions Bob Cohen and executive vice president of publicity Heather Phillips, 20th Television president Greg Meidel and Fox Consumer Products boss Jim Fielding. The layoffs from Fox's Film Division continued from March, May, June, July and more recently in August 2019. As of July 31, 2019, the layoff totaled 250 with the lay off of several dozen employees in the production and visual effects departments with key Fox executives in this group were executive VP of feature production Fred Baron, executive VP of physical production Dana Belcastro, executive VP of post-production Fred Chandler and visual effects John Kilkenny.

Debmar-Mercury announced on April 3 that it would end its national ad sales partnership with 20th Television, and that they would transfer their national ad sales for their first-run and off-network shows by the company to CBS Television Distribution Media Sales. Disney's ESPN unit acquired on April 10 a package of rights to the Big 12 Conference in college athletics that had previously been held by Fox. On April 15, 2019, Hulu acquired AT&T's 9.5% stake in Hulu for $1.43 billion, with Disney and NBCUniversal co-owning the share.

Disney announced on April 24, 2019 that it had canceled a number of upcoming Fox films such as Mouse Guard, News of the World (whose rights were then picked up by Universal Pictures), and an adaptation of Angie Thomas' On the Come Up (whose rights were then moved to Paramount Players), and that some projects, such as The King's Man, Fear Street, and Steven Spielberg's remake of West Side Story, were still in production. On May 7, Disney announced a revised release schedule for several Disney and Fox films. Among the changes, several films (Artemis Fowl, Ad Astra, Spies in Disguise, The New Mutants, and Call of the Wild), were moved to later release dates. All the Fox Marvel films previously scheduled for release after 2019 were removed from the schedule. Avatar: The Way of Water was rescheduled from 2020 to a 2021 Christmas release, after which Avatar sequels will be released every other Christmas holiday release, alternating with Star Wars sequels through 2027.

On April 25, 2019, Shannon Ryan, who was previously Fox Television chief marketing officer, was made president of marketing for ABC Entertainment and Disney Television Studios, she will report directly to Karey Burke, president of ABC Entertainment, and Craig Hunegs, president of Disney Television Studios.

Sinclair Broadcast Group agreed on April 26, 2019 to acquire Fox Sports Networks (excluding YES Network, being sold separately to Yankee Global Enterprises) from Disney for $10 billion. On May 14, 2019, Disney announced it had assumed control of Hulu as part of a put/call agreement with Comcast and its 33% stake in the service. Comcast will continue to license NBCUniversal content and live carriage of NBCUniversal channels until late 2024 and their stake in Hulu could be sold to Disney as early as January of that year. In addition, both companies will fund Hulu's purchase of AT&T's 9.5% stake in Hulu.

Following the acquisition, Disney reorganized its television division to align various operations. On June 10, 2019, Disney announced that both Disney Television Studios and FX Entertainment would share the same casting division. On July 31, 2019, Disney reorganized Hulu's reporting structure, placing Hulu's Scripted Originals team under Walt Disney Television. Under the new structure, Hulu's SVP of Original Scripted Content would report directly to the chairman of Disney Television Studios and ABC Entertainment.

Fox Stage Productions on July 3, 2019 was moved into Disney Theatrical Group as Buena Vista Theatrical division with all top executives leaving at that time. On August 1, 2019, Disney announced that the Fox Research Library will be folded into the Walt Disney Archives and Disney Imagineering Archives by January 2020.

On August 7, 2019, Disney announced that they would overhaul Fox film projects in development except Avatar, Planet of the Apes and Kingsman sequels due to Dark Phoenix causing a third-quarter loss. A new reduced slate of about 10 films per year fully overseen by Disney will now be the main focus, with 20th Century Fox making half of the films for Hulu and Disney+. Fox properties such as Home Alone, Night at the Museum, Cheaper by the Dozen, and Diary of a Wimpy Kid have been assigned for Disney+ release and assigned to Fox Family.

On August 9, 2019, the Los Angeles Times reported that Disney would be pulling all Fox film library titles out of all theater chains and moving them onto either Hulu or Disney+. Little Theatre, a local theater chain in Rochester, New York, was forced to cancel their August 5 screening of Fight Club after Disney notified the theater that it was not allowed to screen the film in the future.

On August 22, 2019, Sinclair completed its acquisition of Fox Sports Networks from Disney. Seven days later, the Yankees/Sinclair/Amazon consortium also completed the acquisition of the 80% share of YES Network from Disney on August 29, 2019 with the Yankees owning 65%, Sinclair owning 20% and Amazon owning the remaining 15%.

On September 10, 2019, Disney announced their plans to sell the video game division of FoxNext, preferring to license its properties for video games rather than develop them.

On October 22, 2019, the Banijay Group announced its intent to acquire Endemol Shine Group from Disney and Apollo Global Management for $2.2 billion. Disney and Apollo agreed to sell Endemol to Banijay on October 26, 2019, pending antitrust approval from regulators. On July 3, 2020, Banijay completed its purchase of Endemol Shine.

On October 24, Vulture reported that Disney was limiting theatrical exhibitions of Fox's older films, with several theaters and film programmers reporting that Fox's back catalogue was no longer available to them. An exception to the new policy was made for The Rocky Horror Picture Show due to that film's traditional midnight screenings and holding the Guinness world record for longest original theatrical release.

In January 2020, Disney began to rebrand Fox's studios to remove references to "Fox" from their names, with 20th Century Fox being renamed "20th Century Studios", and Fox Searchlight Pictures being renamed "Searchlight Pictures".

On January 22, 2020, Disney announced it had sold off a majority of FoxNext's assets, including FoxNext Games Los Angeles, Cold Iron Studios, Aftershock development studios and FoxNext's original IP's, to mobile game developer Scopely. On January 24, 2020, Disney announced they would shutter Fogbank Entertainment.

On January 31, 2020, Disney eliminated the role of Hulu CEO, as part of fully integrating Hulu with Disney's business model. Under the new structure, top Hulu executives would report directly to DTCI and Walt Disney Television leads.

On March 17, 2020, The Wall Street Journal reported that Disney is looking to sell TrueX due to lack of investment after being label a noncore asset.

On May 6, 2020, Brazil's antitrust agency CADE approved the merger between Fox Sports Brazil and ESPN Brasil with conditions requiring Disney to keep Fox Sports Brazil until January 1, 2022, when the channel's operations are expected to be absorbed into ESPN. In the meantime, ESPN and Fox Sports will share the rights to broadcasting sporting events.

On August 10, 2020, Disney announced a reorganization and rebranding of its television studios, with 20th Century Fox Television being subsumed by 20th Television, and Fox 21 Television Studios being rebranded as Touchstone Television (reviving a name dropped in 2007 by what then became ABC Studios — which itself was renamed ABC Signature).

On September 1, 2020, the japanese branch of 20th Century Studios "20th Century Fox Japan" went defunct and was absorbed to The Walt Disney Company Japan causing the without involvement of 20th Century Studios as Japanese co-distributor  with Toei Company and Asian distributor for Dragon Ball Super: Super Hero which are replaced by Crunchyroll and Sony Pictures Releasing (via Sony Pictures Releasing International).

On September 28, 2020, Disney announced that it had sold TrueX to Gimbal, Inc.

On October 1, 2020, Disney and Eredivisie jointly announced that Fox Sports (Netherlands) channels would be rebranded as ESPN. The rebranding is a direct consequence of the acquisition and it occurred on January 1, 2021. Like 21st Century Fox before it, Disney owns 51% of Eredivisie Media & Marketing CV while Eredivisie owns the remaining 49%. Eredivisie Media & Marketing in turn owns Fox (Netherlands) and Fox Sports (Netherlands).

On November 27, 2020, Disney announced that they would be renaming the Fox branded channels in Latin America to Star on February 22, 2021: Fox Channel becomes Star Channel, Fox Life becomes Star Life etc. No rebrand for the Indian feeds has been announced as of July 26, 2021.

On December 30, 2020, Dutch cable provider Ziggo revealed that the European feeds of StarPlus and Star Gold will be rebranded as Utsav Plus and Utsav Gold respectively. The rebranding comes as Disney will use the Star brand name for non-family and mature-oriented programming with its forthcoming hub on Disney+ in several international markets as well as the launch of streaming service Star+ in Latin America.

On February 9, 2021, Deadline Hollywood confirmed that Blue Sky Studios would shut down due to "current economic realities" related to the COVID-19 pandemic and that all of the Blue Sky Studios library and IPs are absorbed by Disney. Blue Sky Studios was shut down on April 10, 2021.

Fox Sports Networks and Fox College Sports were later rebranded as Bally Sports and Stadium College Sports on March 31, 2021.

In March 2021, Disney launched a new 20th Television Animation division for adult animation productions from studios involved in this acquisition.

On April 26, 2021, Fox Sports Go became the Bally Sports app.

On April 27, 2021, Disney announced that most of Fox Networks Group Asia Pacific linear channels will be shut down in two phases in October 2021 for Hong Kong and Southeast Asian countries and January 2022 for Taiwan, respectively. Disney retaining National Geographic, Nat Geo Wild, Star Chinese Channel, and Star Chinese Movies in that region.

On May 14, 2021, Fox 2000 Pictures was shut down by Disney after The Woman in the Window was released on Netflix.

Disney sold Fox Sports Mexico to Grupo Multimedia Lauman in June 2021. Disney was required to sell Fox Sports Mexico as part of the conditions of approval to the 21st Century Fox acquisition in Mexico. Mexican regulators have approved the sale of Fox Sports Mexico to Grupo Multimedia Lauman from Disney. It meets the regulatory requirements of the acquisition process in Mexico.

On August 31, 2021, Disney announced that Hotstar in the United States will be shut down in late 2022. The company also announced that they will be migrating content like Hotstar Specials, Star India's programming, and blockbuster movies to Hulu starting September 1, 2021. The sports content including the Indian Premier League, Board of Control for Cricket in India, International Cricket Council, and Pro Kabaddi League will be migrated to ESPN+. Disney wants Hotstar users to sign up for their Disney streaming bundle of Disney+, Hulu, and ESPN+ in the U.S.. Disney acquired Hotstar through its acquisition of 21st Century Fox.

On October 28, 2021, ViacomCBS (now Paramount Global) announced that it is acquiring TeleColombia from Disney with the acquisition expecting approval in 2022. TeleColombia was sold on November 23, 2021.

On November 4, 2021, Disney announced that they would rebrand the remaining feeds of Fox Sports Latin America to ESPN 4 on December 1, 2021 with the exception of Mexico due to Disney selling Fox Sports Mexico to Grupo Multimedia Lauman.

On January 20, 2022, CNDC ordered Disney to sell the Fox Sports Argentina television network from the 21st Century Fox purchase in order to get an approval from the government of Argentina. On February 15, 2022, Disney announced it sold Fox Sports Argentina to Mediapro. The sale would be approved by the CNDC on April 27, 2022.

On January 26, 2022, Tata Sky was rebranded into Tata Play.

On March 1, 2022, TrueX was rebranded into Infillion by Gimbal, approximately one year after it was sold to Gimbal by Disney.

It was announced that on May 1, 2022, Fox Sports Premium would rebrand to ESPN Premium following Disney acquisition of 21st Century Fox to reflect on that change.

On May 27, 2022, Disney began to rebrand Fox's international studios to remove reference to "Fox" from their name, starting with Fox Star Studios being renamed "Star Studios".
On October 10, 2022, Fox Studios Australia was rebranded into Disney Studios Australia.

Criticism

Despite Disney passing antitrust approval from regulators in every country, critics of Disney's purchase expressed significant antitrust concerns. The deal is a horizontal merger (i.e., in which a company buys up a corporation that produces the same goods and products) as opposed to a vertical merger (i.e., two companies that operate at separate stages of the production process for a specific finished product), much akin to the integrations of AT&T–Time Warner and Comcast–NBC Universal. Horizontal mergers are more likely to be disapproved than vertical mergers, as they affect a more tangible reduction in competition. 

The Federal Trade Commission (FTC) states on its website that "The greatest antitrust concern arises with proposed mergers between direct competitors (horizontal mergers)."

As both Disney and Fox produce films and television series, the deal reduced the number of major film studios in Hollywood from six to five. Some argued the operation would still leave many competitors around since Disney may compete with Netflix in the online streaming market with Disney+ and Hulu in equal conditions with its newly acquired properties. Opponents countered that these arguments do not hold much weight due to Disney's powerful box office and stock market shares, its practices, and its purchase of Fox's many assets.

News media
A film reporter said, "They'll have more control over more things, so if they decide they don't like what you wrote and want to ban you from their screenings, eventually that will mean all of entertainment. For journalists and reporters trying to do their job, it is frightening to see the scope of one company expand in that way and know that your fate is kind of tied up with them." "We've seen a pattern in Disney's behavior. The more power they have, the more they wield it," one entertainment reporter said. A freelance critic and member of the New York Film Critics Circle said that they were troubled by the idea of the Disney–Fox deal.

On November 3, 2017, Disney banned the Los Angeles Times from attending press screenings of its films in retaliation for the paper's coverage of their political influence in Anaheim, California in September of that year. On November 7, however, Disney reversed its decision, after receiving massive protests and condemnation from a number of major publications and writers including The New York Times, The Boston Globe critic Ty Burr, The Washington Post blogger Alyssa Rosenberg, A Wrinkle in Time director Ava DuVernay, the websites The A.V. Club and Flavorwire, and film critic organizations which threatened to disqualify Disney films from their year-end awards in retaliation, specifically, the National Society of Film Critics, Los Angeles Film Critics Association, New York Film Critics Circle, and Boston Society of Film Critics.

Jason Bailey, the editor of Flavorwire, thought the way Disney treated the Los Angeles Times was "absolutely chilling", fearing it would only grow more common after the merger:

One film writer stated that "I personally worry that a studio this big will need the press less and less. I don't think anything drastic will change immediately, but I think it is more important than ever for entertainment reporters to uphold journalistic values. We are not their PR arms, no matter how much they'd like us to be." Another film reporter said, "As a critic, I've had Disney tell me they don't want to invite me to [its] film because I didn't like the last one. It really scares me to watch them get even more power."

Theaters
Unlike other studios, Disney has a reputation for strict conditions being forced upon theater owners for its films, such as Avengers: Age of Ultron and Star Wars: The Last Jedi. For the latter, Disney demanded a 65% cut of domestic ticket sales (rather than the minimum 55% to 60% cut) along with a four-week hold in each venue, and a 5% penalty to any theater owner who breaks any part of the contract, including taking the film off-screen. If the Disney–Fox deal had happened in late 2016, Disney's domestic box office in 2017 would have equaled $4.5 billion or 40% market share, a figure no major studio has ever hit. For some, the deal would give Disney unprecedented market power in the industry.

One distribution studio executive denounced the deal, saying that "If I was an independent mom-and-pop theater, I would just close down; there's no way to survive. With a 40% market share, how do you negotiate against that?" John Roper, the general manager of the Phoenix Theatre in Fort Nelson, British Columbia, said that Disney/Fox had him worried about even stricter rules in the future, stating, "It's not good for any type of industry when a company grows that large. Disney holds all the cards, and we have to play by their rules. Smaller cinemas are just left in the dust." Roper decided not to screen Star Wars: The Last Jedi because of Disney's strict conditions of requiring the theater to run the film four weeks straight and play it four times a day (as opposed to other studios, who only require a minimum of two weeks for a film run and play it one time a day). Elkader Cinema in Elkader, Iowa, opted out the movie for the same reason, with owner Lee Akin stating that "I can't get the entire town in my auditorium in one week's time let alone four."

In Brazil, Disney demanded a 52% cut of Cocos domestic ticket sales (rather than the historical 50% cut) and some theaters (with exceptions including foreign chains, such as Cinemark Theatres and Cinépolis) boycotted the film. Coco was shown in 618 screens, against 919 screens that showed Sony Pictures' Jumanji: Welcome to the Jungle.

On November 22, 2019, the U.S. Department of Justice formally filed its motion for a federal court order to nullify the Paramount Decrees, which was set in place after the 1948 case United States v. Paramount Pictures, Inc. that required movie studios to divest themselves of their theatrical arms, and prohibited certain anti-competitive practices in the distribution business. The Department had cited the shifting realities of an industry that has come to rely on online revenue such as streaming services as a justification. David Sims of The Atlantic wrote that such move would be very disruptive to the theater industry:

The National Association of Theatre Owners (NATO), which represents major theater chains, expressed its concern about the murky future the DOJ could create, saying "If exhibitors were forced to book out the vast majority of their screens on major studio films for most of the year, this would leave little to no room for important films from smaller studios."

Pay television industry
American Cable Association President and CEO Matthew M. Polka lambasted the deal and called on federal regulators to "fully investigate" the merger. He was concerned about his smaller subscription television constituents having to negotiate multichannel deals with a behemoth that combines Fox's regional sports networks with ESPN and its cadre of collegiate-conference-focused RSNs, as well as the majority stake in Hulu:

Many European telecommunication companies also expressed concerns about the Disney–Fox deal, considering that Sky plc and Sky UK were included in the package, as it serves almost 23 million households across Britain, Ireland, Germany, Austria, and Italy. Disney's takeover of Sky would be greater than RTL Group, Mediaset, ITV, ProSiebenSat.1 Media, Viasat, and Vivendi combined, according to Eikon estimates, and could allow Sky to expand into new markets and bid more for sports rights and other content. Some felt that a Disney-owned Sky UK would be most damaging to its pay-TV competitors since it has invested in content to cross-sell television with mobile services, in a bid to squeeze more out of customers. A hedge fund with a small stake in Sky has complained that the Disney–Fox deal could cost minority shareholders in the UK satellite broadcaster a hefty premium unless UK regulators intervene.

Dish Network CEO Erik Carlson said blockbuster mergers like the Disney–Fox deal could severely limit the number of content companies providing to their customers. Carlson said on CNBC's Squawk on the Street that "We really take the position that we think about the customer and the customer first."

Entertainment industry
The Writers Guild of America West, the union that represents writers of films, television, and other media, wrote that:

Tom Rothman, chairman of the Sony Pictures Entertainment Motion Picture Group and former co-chairman of Fox Filmed Entertainment, said the Disney–Fox deal was a dangerous proposition: "Consolidation under giant corporate mandates rarely promotes creative risk-taking. And in the long run, it is always a challenge to compete against horizontal monopolistic power."

James Mangold, director of Fox's Marvel adaptations The Wolverine and its R-rated sequel Logan, expressed concerns that the deal might lead to the approval of a similar film that may have more limited appeal than a conventional Marvel blockbuster, thereby limiting the opportunities for certain filmmakers as well as the consumers. Mangold said that "If they're actually changing their mandate, if what they're supposed to do alters, that would be sad to me because it just means less movies."

At the Critics' Choice Movie Awards on January 11, 2018, producer J. Miles Dale, who accepted the Critics' Choice Movie Award for Best Picture for The Shape of Water, urged Disney "not to mess" with 20th Century Fox's indie studio Fox Searchlight Pictures, saying, "they're making the kind of movies that we need to make, we want to make, and people need to see."

Writer Marc Guggenheim, known for his work for the Arrowverse for The CW, said that "As a writer, I'm not a big fan of these big corporate consolidations. I don't think they're necessarily good for writers, directors, producers, and actors. I also, as an American, don't love these big corporate mergers. I don't think they're necessarily good for the country."

The potential acquisition of Fox by Disney caused concern within the entertainment industry that smaller media companies, including Viacom, CBS Corporation, Lionsgate, and Metro-Goldwyn-Mayer, would need to consolidate or be sold in order to remain competitive.

On February 13, 2018, television producer Ryan Murphy, a long-time collaborator of 20th Century Fox Television, signed a five-year $300 million agreement with Netflix, a move considered to be a big blow to Fox and Disney. Murphy cited the Disney–Fox deal as the main reason for departure, arguing that his freedom under Disney might be severely limited in creating new, risk-taking content.

Jeff Bock of Exhibitor Relations expressed hope that the merger would force creativity in other studios like Paramount, which might focus on smaller-budget films knowing that it could not compete with Walt Disney (after the Fox acquisition) in making big-budget blockbusters.

Viacom CEO Bob Bakish has stated that the Disney–Fox deal provides a "very real opportunity" to hire new executive and creative talent at Paramount and other studios amid the "dislocation associated with change of ownership" at Disney and Fox. Bakish also suggested that Viacom and other companies can provide new content for streaming services such as Netflix once Disney removes their content from the service in 2019.

Walt Disney Studios co-chairman and CEO Alan F. Horn acknowledged that Disney has a stranglehold on the entertainment industry especially after the Fox acquisition, but defended against the monopoly accusations:

Tom Reimann of Collider said that "Horn's bizarre, rambling rationalization veers towards seemingly deliberate obfuscation at several points" by saying that he "point[ed] out that Disney makes a wide variety of films (the two topics are wholly unrelated) while admitting only that Disney enjoys 'a very hefty percentage of the box office' without acknowledging that the studio has bought out most of its meaningful competition."

Political reaction
Former President Donald Trump praised both companies for the merger, believing it is best for American jobs. However, U.S. Representative David Cicilline of Rhode Island, the ranking Democrat on the House Antitrust Subcommittee, expressed concerns over the transaction. He said in a statement that "Disney's proposed purchase of 21st Century Fox threatens to put control of even more television, movie, and news content into the hands of a single media giant. If it's approved, this acquisition could allow Disney to limit what consumers can watch and increase their cable bills," he said. "Disney will gain more than 300 channels, 22 regional sports networks, control over Hulu, and a significant portion of Roku."

Other comments
Richard Greenfield, a BTIG Research analyst, wrote that the combined Disney and Fox assets would have a 39% theatrical market share:

In response to the Disney–Fox deal, analyst Andy Hargreaves of KeyBanc Capital Markets Inc. downgraded Fox's stock from overweight to Sector Weight with no assigned price target. Hargreaves said that although the merger is positive for both companies, it comes with a high antitrust risk due to Disney's potential share of theatrical revenue, its share of domestic cable assets, its strong position in sports, and its power to already force preferential deals with cable, satellite, and theater owners.

David Balto, an antitrust lawyer and former policy director at the FTC, said that the inclusion of regional sports networks would give Disney greater leverage with cable and satellite distributors: "Any increase in Disney sports programming will be extremely problematic and will get intense scrutiny".

John Simpson of the activist group Consumer Watchdog said that the deal "would give far too much monopolistic power to Disney, which is known for cutthroat, hardball tactics", and "can only mean higher prices and less choice for consumers."

Barton Crockett, a media analyst at B. Riley FBR, said that "Disney is becoming the Wal-Mart of Hollywood: huge and dominant. That's going to have a big influence up and down the supply chain."

Ian Bezek, contributor to InvestorPlace, questioned the underlying rationale for the merger, asking why Disney needed to acquire Fox's film production and cable sports business for such a "high price", given Disney's already healthy positions in both businesses:

Jonathan Barnett, law professor at the University of Southern California Gould School of Law states that when considering streaming services under the same markets as theaters, worries about Disney's control "would be substantially diminished".

Matt Stoller, in his article for Pro-Market website, argued that:

Assets

Disney
Disney acquired the majority of 21st Century Fox's entertainment assets. These assets include:

 20th Century Fox – on January 17, 2020 became 20th Century Studios
 Fox Family – became 20th Century Family
 20th Century Fox Animation – became 20th Century Animation
 Blue Sky Studios – Shut down on April 7, 2021
 Fox Searchlight Pictures – on January 17, 2020 became Searchlight Pictures
 Fox Star Studios – on May 27, 2022 became Star Studios
 Fox 2000 Pictures – Shut down on May 14, 2021
 Fox Studios Australia – on October 10, 2022 became Disney Studios Australia
 Fox Stage Productions – on July 3, 2019 became Buena Vista Theatrical division within Disney Theatrical Group
 Boom! Studios (minority stake)
Regency Enterprises (20%)
 20th Century Fox Television – on August 10, 2020 became 20th Television
 The original iteration of 20th Television - merged into Disney–ABC Domestic Television
 Fox Television Animation – on March 30, 2021 became 20th Television Animation
 Fox 21 Television Studios – on August 10, 2020 became the second Touchstone Television but later merged into 20th Television in December 2020.
 Fox Networks Group - U.S. division merged with Disney–ABC Television Group to form Walt Disney Television 
 FX Networks
 FX Productions
 National Geographic Partners (73%)
 Fox Networks Group Latin America – became Disney Networks Group Latin America in 2021.
 Fox Networks Group Europe – merging with Africa & Middle East to became Disney Networks Group Europe, Middle East & Africa in 2022.
 Fox Networks Group Africa – merging with Europe & Middle East to became Disney Networks Group Europe, Middle East & Africa in 2022.
 Fox Networks Group Middle East – merging with Europe & Africa to became Disney Networks Group Europe, Middle East & Africa in 2022.
 Fox Networks Group Asia Pacific – became Disney Networks Group Asia Pacific in 2021.
 Star India  – on 14 April 2022 became Disney Star
 Hulu (30%)
 DraftKings (minority investment)
(Note: Disney had already acquired Fox Family Worldwide in 2001, with Saban Entertainment becoming BVS Entertainment in 2002, with it being shut down later that year, and the international Fox Kids channels becoming Jetix worldwide before its shut down in 2010.)

Fox Corporation
On November 14, 2018, it was revealed that a new independent company, which was tentatively called "New Fox", would be named Fox Corporation. The company implemented its structure on January 1, 2019. Its assets include Fox's broadcast, news and sports businesses. They include:

 Fox Broadcasting Company
 Fox Television Stations Group
 MyNetworkTV
 Fox News Media Group
 Fox News Channel
 Fox Business Network
 Fox Sports Media Group (United States only)
 Fox Sports 1
 Fox Sports 2
 Fox Deportes
 Big Ten Network (51%)
 The Fox studio lot in Century City (Fox Corporation owns the real estate via Fox Studio Lot, LLC, although it is leased to Disney for the newly renamed 20th Century Studios)

Divested
Assets that were initially included in the acquisition, but have since been sold off to third parties.

 Sky plc (39.14%) – On September 26, 2018, Fox sold their 39% stake in Sky to Comcast at £17.28-per-share, valuing Fox's stake at £11.6 billion ($15 billion) after Comcast's winning bid for Sky.
 A&E Networks Europe (50%) – On November 6, 2018, the European Commission ruled that Disney must sell the European factual channels of A&E, including History, H2, Crime & Investigation, Blaze and Lifetime. Hearst Communications, which owns the second half of A&E, has entered talks to acquire Disney's share in these networks. On January 28, 2019, Hearst assumed full ownership of A&E Networks Europe.
 Walt Disney Studios Sony Pictures Releasing de México – On January 31, 2019, Disney agreed to sell its stake in the Mexican film distribution joint venture to Sony Pictures Entertainment Motion Picture Group.
 Fox Sports Networks – Regional sports networks that would be acquired by Disney, but under the agreement with the Department of Justice must be sold to third parties within 90 days after the completion and formal closing of the main deal. On April 26, 2019, the Sinclair Broadcast Group agreed to acquire Fox Sports Networks (excluding the YES Network) from Disney for $10 billion. Fox Sports Networks was later rebranded as Bally Sports on March 31, 2021.
 Fox College Sports – On March 31, 2021 became Stadium College Sports
 Fox Sports Go – On April 26, 2021 became the Bally Sports app
 YES Network (80%) – Yankee Global Enterprises invoked a clause to give it the right of first refusal to buy their stake back following the acquisition of Fox Sports from Disney. On March 8, 2019, the YES Network was sold to a consortium including Yankee Global Enterprises, Amazon, and Sinclair Broadcast Group for $3.5 billion.
 Fox Sports Latin America (Argentine and Mexican version) – On February 21, 2019, Bloomberg reported that Disney has agreed to divest the Mexican and Brazilian Fox Sports channels. The Federal Telecommunications Institute has set the deadline for the Mexican channel on May 1, 2020. On November 13, 2019, Brazil's antitrust regulator CADE said that it would reassess Disney's purchase of Fox because the company did not divest Fox Sports. In December 2019, Mexican broadcaster Televisa won an injunction against Disney and Fox Sports. On May 6, 2020, CADE announced that Fox Sports Brazil and ESPN Brasil would merge on January 1, 2022 due to Fox Sports' structure and broadcasting rights with channel being kept on air for one year. On May 22, 2021, Grupo Multimedia Lauman announced it agreed to acquire Fox Sports Mexico from Disney while Disney announced that remaining feeds in Latin America of the Fox Sports channel were going to be renamed to ESPN 4 on December 1, 2021. On February 9, 2022, Disney announced that it would sell Fox Sports Argentina to Mediapro with the deal being expected to close in 2022, pending regulatory approval. The sale was approved by the CNDC on April 27, 2022.
 Debmar-Mercury (advertising sales only) – On April 3, 2019, Lionsgate announced it had transferred its national ad sales from the original incarnation of 20th Television to CBS Television Distribution for its syndicated shows.
 FoxNext's gaming assets – On September 10, 2019, Disney announced plans to sell off FoxNext's gaming assets. In January 2020, Disney sold off a majority of FoxNext's assets (including FoxNext Games Los Angeles, Cold Iron Studios, Aftershock, and their original IPs) to Scopely. Disney later closed down the Fogbank Entertainment development studio.
 Endemol Shine Group (50%) – On October 22, 2019, Banijay announced its intent to acquire Endemol Shine from Disney and Apollo for $2.2 billion. Disney and Apollo agreed to sell Endemol to Banijay on October 26, 2019, pending antitrust approval. On July 1, 2020, the European Commission approved of Banijay's purchase. The sale was completed on July 3, 2020.
 TrueX – On March 17, 2020 it was reported by The Wall Street Journal that Disney was looking to sell TrueX due to lack of investment after being labeled a non-core asset. On September 28, 2020, TrueX was sold to Gimbal, Inc.
 TeleColombia (formerly Fox TeleColombia) – On October 28, 2021, ViacomCBS (now Paramount Global) announced it was acquiring a majority stake in TeleColombia (& its division Estudios TeleMéxico) from Disney. The acquisition closed on November 23 of that year.

See also
 Acquisition of NBC Universal by Comcast, a media merger of similar but entirely vertical scale.
 2019 merger of CBS and Viacom, a media merger deal that combined the operations of CBS Corporation and Viacom, which had previously split in 2005 from Viacom's original incarnation, into a new company called ViacomCBS (now Paramount Global).
 Concentration of media ownership

References

2019 mergers and acquisitions
2019 in American television
March 2019 events in the United States
Fox Corporation
History of The Walt Disney Company